Tim Gallagher is an editor.

Tim or Timothy Gallagher may also refer to:

Tim Gallagher is a Manchester based singer/songwriter.

See also
Timothy Gallagher (disambiguation)